John Michael Batorski (September 27, 1920 – November 16, 1982) was an American football end in the All-America Football Conference for the Buffalo Bisons.  He played college football at Colgate University and was drafted in the 18th round of the 1944 NFL Draft by the Washington Redskins.

1920 births
1982 deaths
American football wide receivers
Buffalo Bisons (AAFC) players
People from Lackawanna, New York
People from East Setauket, New York